Piney may refer to:

Places

United States
 Piney, Arkansas (disambiguation)
 Piney Buttes, Montana, a set of buttes
 Piney, Oklahoma, a census designated place
 Piney Township, Clarion County, Pennsylvania
 Piney River (disambiguation)
 Piney Creek (disambiguation)
 Piney Woods, an ecoregion in the southern United States

Elsewhere
 Rural Municipality of Piney, Manitoba, Canada
 Piney, Manitoba, a community within the municipality
 Piney, Aube, France, a commune

Other uses
 Duc de Piney, a title in the peerage of France; see Duke of Piney-Luxembourg
 nickname of Joseph Armone (1917-1992), American mobster and member of the Gambino crime family
 Piney Gir, often shortened to Piney, American musician and singer born Angela Penhaligon
 Piney (Pine Barrens resident), a derogatory term for a resident of the New Jersey Pine Barrens
 Piney Winston, a character in the American television series Sons of Anarchy

See also
Big Piney (disambiguation)